Freeway Park, officially known as Jim Ellis Freeway Park, is an urban park in Seattle, Washington, United States, connecting the city's downtown to the Washington State Convention Center and First Hill. The park sits atop a section of Interstate 5 and a large city-owned parking lot; 8th Avenue also bridges over the park. An unusual mixture of brutalist architecture and greenery, the  park, designed by Lawrence Halprin's office under the supervision of Angela Danadjieva, opened to the public on July 4, 1976, at a cost of $23.5 million. A later addition to the park opened in 1982 winds several blocks up First Hill, with a staircase and wheelchair ramp.

The park is also a cultural landscape and a precedent setting park that, according to The Cultural Landscape Foundation, helped define a new land-use typology for American cities. It was listed on the National Register of Historic Places on December 19, 2019, having been listed on the Washington Heritage Register in a unanimous vote on October 25. In May 2022 it also gained official landmark status from the City of Seattle.

The park's unique architecture has made it famous among parkour enthusiasts. The World Freerunning and Parkour Federation listed Freeway Park second on its list of the seven best parkour locations in the world.

History 
A series of crimes, notably a January 18, 2002 murder, briefly gave the park a reputation as a haven for crime and led to calls for a radical redesign. Many at first attributed the dangers to the design of the park. A neighborhood group formed under the name Freeway Park Neighborhood Association (FPNA) collaborated with the city's parks and recreation department to produce an "activation plan" for the park, published in 2005 as "A New Vision for Freeway Park". The report concluded that the park's problems could be remedied by numerous small changes: increased security patrols, better lighting, pruning back of certain plants, and above all increased use, both in terms of organized events and simply encouraging more convention center visitors to use the park. The strategy, only partly implemented , seems to be succeeding: according to David Brewster of the FPNA, crime in the park is down 90% compared to that of 2002. The park was renovated in 2008 and renamed to honor civic leader Jim Ellis.

Gallery

References

Further reading

External links

 Official website (Seattle Parks and Recreation)
 Freeway Park Association website
 Three 1988 images of the park.
 Virtual Reality Tour of Freeway Park, requires QuickTime.

Brutalist architecture in Washington (state)
Parks in Seattle
Downtown Seattle
1976 establishments in Washington (state)
National Register of Historic Places in Seattle
Landmarks in Seattle
Parks on the National Register of Historic Places in Washington (state)